Daniil Dmitriyevich Shamkin (born 22 June 2002) is a Russian football player who plays as an attacking midfielder or forward for KAMAZ Naberezhnye Chelny on loan from FC Zenit Saint Petersburg.

Club career
He made his debut in the Russian Football National League for FC Zenit-2 Saint Petersburg on 3 March 2019 in a game against FC Shinnik Yaroslavl, as a starter.

He made his debut in the Russian Premier League for FC Zenit Saint Petersburg on 14 March 2020 in a game against FC Ural Yekaterinburg.

On 21 July 2021, he joined FC Baltika Kaliningrad on a season-long loan. On 2 July 2022, Shamkin was loaned to KAMAZ Naberezhnye Chelny.

International career
He represented Russia at the 2019 UEFA European Under-17 Championship.

Honours
Zenit Saint Petersburg
 Russian Premier League: 2019–20, 2020–21

Career statistics

Club

References

External links
 
 
 Profile by Russian Football National League
 

2002 births
Footballers from Saint Petersburg
Living people
Russian footballers
Russia youth international footballers
Association football forwards
FC Zenit-2 Saint Petersburg players
FC Zenit Saint Petersburg players
FC Baltika Kaliningrad players
FC KAMAZ Naberezhnye Chelny players
Russian Premier League players
Russian First League players
Russian Second League players